Artuklu is another name of the Artuqids, a dynasty in Anatolia.

Artuklu may also refer to:
Artuklu, Mardin, a district of Mardin Province, Turkey
Artuklu Ilgazi, a bey of that dynasty
Artuklu Palace, a palace near Diyarbakir, Turkey